Kordestan-e Kuchek (also Romanized as Kordestān-e Kūchek; also known as Kordestān, Kordestān-e ‘Olyā, and Kurdistān) is a village in Dodangeh Rural District, in the Central District of Behbahan County, Khuzestan Province, Iran. At the 2006 census, its population was 492, in 91 families.

References 

Populated places in Behbahan County